is a former Japanese football player.

Playing career
Shimokawa was born in Amagasaki on November 17, 1975. After dropped out from Momoyama Gakuin University, he joined J1 League club Cerezo Osaka in 1996. Although he could not play at all in the match behind Gilmar Rinaldi, he became a regular goalkeeper from July 1997. He played many matches as regular goalkeeper for a long time and the club won the 2nd place 2001 and 2003 Emperor's Cup. However his opportunity to play decreased behind young goalkeeper Daisuke Tada in 2003. In 2004, he moved to Kawasaki Frontale. However he could hardly play in the match behind Shinya Yoshihara and Takashi Aizawa. In 2006, he moved to Oita Trinita. He battles with Shusaku Nishikawa for the position. Although he could hardly play in the match behind in 2006, he played many matches for Nishikawa's injury and poor performance in 2007 and 2008. The club also won the champions 2008 J.League Cup first major title in the club history. However he could hardly play in the match in 2009 and the club was relegated to J2 League. The club released many players including Nishikawa end of 2009 season due to their financial problems. In 2010, although he played as regular goalkeeper, his opportunity to play decreased behind young goalkeeper Keisuke Shimizu and he retired end of 2010 season.

Club statistics

References

External links

1975 births
Living people
Momoyama Gakuin University alumni
Association football people from Hyōgo Prefecture
Japanese footballers
J1 League players
J2 League players
Cerezo Osaka players
Kawasaki Frontale players
Oita Trinita players
Association football goalkeepers